Tugayevo (Tuğay) is a rural locality (a village) in Kushmanakovsky Selsoviet, Burayevsky District, Bashkortostan, Russia. The population was 229 as of 2010. There are 8 streets.

Geography 
Tugayevo is located 6 km west of Burayevo (the district's administrative centre) by road. Kudashevo is the nearest rural locality.

References 

Rural localities in Burayevsky District